The R591 road is a regional road in Ireland. It is a road on the Mizen Peninsula in County Cork. Most of the road forms part of the Wild Atlantic Way.

The R591 travels southwest from the N71 near Bantry to the village of Durrus. Durrus is also a gateway to the Sheep's Head Peninsula, the Mizen Peninsula's northern neighbour across Dunmanus Bay. The R591 continues via Toormore and Goleen. The road ends at Crookhaven, a yachting harbour village. Before Crookhaven, a scenic, rugged minor road leads to Mizen Head.

References

Regional roads in the Republic of Ireland
Roads in County Cork